The 1914 Georgia Bulldogs baseball team represented the Georgia Bulldogs of the University of Georgia in the 1914 NCAA baseball season, winning the SIAA championship.

References

Georgia Bulldogs
Georgia Bulldogs baseball seasons
Southern Intercollegiate Athletic Association baseball champion seasons
Georgia Bull